The MacIntyre Mountains or MacIntyre Range is a range of mountains in the High Peaks region of the Adirondacks, due west of Mount Marcy, in northeastern New York State. The range runs  from southwest to northeast. Its sheer southwest slope makes up one side of Indian Pass, and a northeastern spur forms the cliffs of Avalanche Pass.

The range includes Iroquois, Mount Marshall, Wright, and Algonquin, the second-highest peak in the state.  Despite being spelled differently, it is named for the founder of the McIntyre Iron Works at Tahawus, New York, Archibald McIntyre.

See also 
 List of mountains in New York

References

Adirondack High Peaks
Landforms of Essex County, New York
Mountain ranges of New York (state)